Girlhood may refer to:

 the state or period of a female being a girl
 Girlhood (film), a 2014 French film by Céline Sciamma
 Girlhood (album), a 2017 album by The Preatures

See also 
 Boyhood (disambiguation)
 Childhood
 Girlhood studies